Nephrogramma is a genus of moths of the family Crambidae.

Species
Nephrogramma reniculalis (Zeller, 1872)
Nephrogramma separata

References

Natural History Museum Lepidoptera genus database

Glaphyriinae
Crambidae genera
Taxa named by Eugene G. Munroe